The Wales national under-18 football team is the national under-18 football team of Wales and is controlled by the Football Association of Wales.

Current squad
 The following players were called up for the friendly matches.
 Match dates: 7, 10 and 13 June 2022
 Opposition: ,  and 
 Caps and goals correct as of:''' 28 March 2022, after the match against

See also
 Football Association of Wales
 Wales national football team
 Wales national under-21 football team
 Wales national under-20 football team
 Wales national under-19 football team
 Wales national under-17 football team

References

F
European national under-18 association football teams
Youth football in Wales